Arturo Alonso-Sandoval is an American politician who is the member of the Oklahoma House of Representatives from the 89th district.

Early life and education
Alonso was born in the United States, but lived in Guanajuato City, Mexico until he was four. His family then moved to Oklahoma City, where he attended Santa Fe South High School for middle and high school. While in high school, he volunteered on Michael Brooks-Jimenez's state senate campaign. He then attended the University of Oklahoma where and graduated with a BS in mechanical engineering in May 2022. Alonso is bilingual in English and Spanish.

Career
Alonso ran for the 89th district of the Oklahoma House of Representatives in 2022. The seat was vacant after the resignation of Jose Cruz. He faced Cristian Zapata and Chris Bryant in the Democratic primary. Alonso won the June 28 Democratic primary and since no candidate from another party filed in the district, he won the seat outright. He was sworn in November 16, 2022.

References

21st-century American politicians
Democratic Party members of the Oklahoma House of Representatives
Hispanic and Latino American state legislators in Oklahoma
Living people
People from Guanajuato City
Politicians from Oklahoma City
University of Oklahoma alumni
Year of birth missing (living people)